Milan Fabrizio van Ewijk (born 8 September 2000) is a Dutch professional footballer who plays as a right-back for SC Heerenveen in the Eredivisie.

Career
On 29 June 2019, Van Ewijk signed with ADO Den Haag after a successful season with Excelsior Maassluis. He made his professional debut with ADO Den Haag in a 4–2 Eredivisie loss to FC Utrecht on 4 August 2019.

Personal life
Born in the Netherlands, van Ewijk is of Surinamese descent.

References

External links
 
 

2000 births
Living people
Footballers from Amsterdam
Dutch footballers
Dutch sportspeople of Surinamese descent
Association football fullbacks
Excelsior Maassluis players
ADO Den Haag players
SC Cambuur players
SC Heerenveen players
Eredivisie players
Eerste Divisie players
Tweede Divisie players